ORG-12962 is a pyridinylpiperazine drug developed by Organon, which acts as a potent and selective agonist for the 5-HT2 receptor family, with highest affinity at 5-HT2C and lowest at 5-HT2B subtypes. It was developed as a potential anti-anxiety drug, but was discontinued from human trials after tests in a public speaking challenge showed that its anti-anxiety effects were accompanied by side effects such as dizziness and a "spacey" feeling, which were attributed to poor selectivity in vivo over the hallucinogenic 5-HT2A receptor.

Synthesis
Note that patent serves to deliver 1-[3-chloro-5-(trifluoromethyl)pyridin-2-yl]piperazine [132834-59-4], although patent is correct one: CID:9796408. Hence, ORG-12962, would need 2,6-Dichloro-3-(trifluoromethyl)pyridine [55304-75-1].

2,3-dichloro-5-trifluoromethylpyridine [69045-84-7]

See also
 2C-B-PP
 2,3-Dichlorophenylpiperazine
 3-Chloro-4-fluorophenylpiperazine
 CPD-1
 ORG-37684
 Quipazine

References

Serotonin receptor agonists
Piperazines
Trifluoromethyl compounds
Aminopyridines